Humeston is a city in Wayne County, Iowa, United States. The population was 465 in the 2020 census, a decline from 542 in 2000.

Geography

Demographics

2010 census
As of the census of 2010, there were 494 people, 234 households, and 134 families living in the city. The racial makeup of the city was 97.0% White, 0.2% African American, 0.4% Native American, 0.4% Asian, 0.2% from other races, and 1.8% from two or more races. Hispanic or Latino of any race were 0.6% of the population.

There were 234 households, of which 23.9% had children under the age of 18 living with them, 48.3% were married couples living together, 6.0% had a female householder with no husband present, 3.0% had a male householder with no wife present, and 42.7% were non-families. 40.6% of all households were made up of individuals, and 30.8% had someone living alone who was 65 years of age or older. The average household size was 2.11 and the average family size was 2.89.

The median age in the city was 48.7 years. 21.1% of residents were under the age of 18; 5.9% were between the ages of 18 and 24; 17.7% were from 25 to 44; 27% were from 45 to 64; and 28.5% were 65 years of age or older. The gender makeup of the city was 46.0% male and 54.0% female.

2000 census
As of the census of 2000, there were 543 people, 265 households, and 148 families living in the city. The racial makeup of the city was 98.53% White, 0.55% Native American, 0.37% Asian, and 0.55% from two or more races. Hispanic or Latino of any race were 1.29% of the population.

There were 265 households, out of which 20.8% had children under the age of 18 living with them, 48.3% were married couples living together, 5.7% had a female householder with no husband present, and 43.8% were non-families. 41.1% of all households were made up of individuals, and 26.4% had someone living alone who was 65 years of age or older. The average household size was 2.05 and the average family size was 2.79.

In the city, the population was spread out, with 20.3% under the age of 18, 5.5% from 18 to 24, 23.9% from 25 to 44, 21.5% from 45 to 64, and 28.7% who were 65 years of age or older. The median age was 46 years. For every 100 females, there were 81.6 males. For every 100 females age 18 and over, there were 82.7 males.

The median income for a household in the city was $22,917, and the median income for a family was $33,214. Males had a median income of $26,563 versus $16,125 for females. The per capita income for the city was $15,617. About 13.9% of families and 21.4% of the population were below the poverty line, including 33.3% of those under age 18 and 17.8% of those age 65 or over.

Education
Mormon Trail Community School District operates schools serving the community.

Notable person
Chris Street, basketball player at University of Iowa, born in Humeston

See also

Bluegrass Conference
Humeston and Shenandoah Railway
Iowa Highway 2

References

External links

Humeston, Iowa Portal style website, Businesses, Local attractions, and more

Cities in Iowa
Cities in Wayne County, Iowa